Pseudophisma is a genus of moths of the family Erebidae. The genus was erected by George Hampson in 1926.

Species
Pseudophisma aeolida H. Druce, 1890
Pseudophisma delunaris H. Druce
Pseudophisma diatonica Möschler, 1880
Pseudophisma pritanis Cramer, 1779
Pseudophisma sinuata Schaus, 1901

References

Calpinae